Luis David Cerutti (born 20 September 1974 in Morteros) is a former Argentine footballer.

Club career
Cerutti previously played for Chacarita Juniors in the Primera B Nacional Argentina during 2005, helping them avoid relegation. After a short stint with Ecuatorian side Olmedo, he relocated to Bolivia where he played for Universitario de Sucre  in 2007 and San José during 2008.

Next, Cerutti joined The Strongest for the Campeonato Apertura 2009, but missed the first two opening rounds of matches as his international clearance was not available in time.

References

External links
 Argentine Primera statistics  
 

1974 births
Living people
Sportspeople from Córdoba Province, Argentina
Argentine footballers
Association football forwards
Chacarita Juniors footballers
Club Atlético Belgrano footballers
Club San José players
The Strongest players
Argentine expatriate sportspeople in Bolivia
Expatriate footballers in Bolivia
Expatriate footballers in Ecuador
Argentine expatriate sportspeople in Ecuador
Club Atlético Sarmiento footballers